Calamagrostis nardifolia is a species of grass native to the southern Andes.

Description

Ecology
Calamagrostis nardifolia is one of the fodder species preferred by vicuñas during the wet season.

References

nardifolia
Flora of the Andes
Plants described in 1874
Taxa named by Eduard Hackel